Hash House a go go is an American restaurant chain founded and headquartered in San Diego, California in July 2000. Known for large portions of breakfast food, it has additional locations in Connecticut, Florida, Nevada, New Jersey and Utah.

Description
The original location has been featured on numerous television shows, including Food Paradise, The Martha Stewart Show, Rachael Ray's Rachael's Vacation and Chefs vs. City. One of the Las Vegas locations was featured on Man v. Food. The restaurant has since expanded itself to Chicago (now closed), Mohegan Sun Connecticut, Orlando, Dallas–Fort Worth area and St. George, Utah.

See also

 List of pancake houses

References

External links

 

2000 establishments in California
Companies based in San Diego
Pancake houses
Restaurant chains in the United States
Restaurants established in 2000
Restaurants in San Diego